Certej may refer to several places in Romania:

Certeju de Sus, a commune in Hunedoara County
Certeju de Jos, a village in Vorța Commune, Hunedoara County
Certej (river), a tributary of the Mureș in Hunedoara County